not to be confused with Perry Correctional Institution, Pelzer, South Carolina

Despite its name the prison has never been operated by, or housed prisoners of, Perry County. It opened in April 2006. A contract with the Vermont Department of Corrections for the housing of 80 offenders ended in April 2009 amid allegations of understaffing and inmates being injured. It was Vermont's first private-prison contract.  

On May 25, 2009, prisoners Ashton Mink and Joshua Southwick escaped and were re-captured after a 14-hour shootout in Gladstone, North Dakota. Shortly thereafter Alabama removed its 250 prisoners from the facility, citing money concerns, although state Prison Commissioner Richard Allen noted that LCS had taken eleven and a half hours to notify officials of the Memorial Day escape.

The facility continues to house federal inmates of the U.S. Immigration and Customs Enforcement and the United States Marshals Service.  only about 30 federal prisoners were held in Perry even though the Alabama state system was running at an average 192% capacity.

References

Prisons in Alabama
Buildings and structures in Perry County, Alabama
Private prisons in the United States
Immigration detention centers and prisons in the United States
2006 establishments in Alabama